Pippi in the South Seas may refer to

Pippi in the South Seas (book) a 1948 novel by Astrid Lindgren
Pippi in the South Seas (film) a film based on the book